C25 is a secondary route in Namibia that runs from the northern B1 junction in Rehoboth to the C23 near Leonardville.

References 

Roads in Namibia